Jonesboro Municipal Airport  is located three miles east of Jonesboro, in Craighead County, Arkansas. It is mostly used for general aviation and is served by Southern Airways Express through the federally subsidized Essential Air Service program.

The National Plan of Integrated Airport Systems for 2021–2025 categorized it as a non-primary commercial service airport.

The first airline flights were Ozark DC-3s in 1950–51; Ozark left in 1954–55. Trans-Texas DC-3s appeared in 1961, and Texas International's last Convair 600 left in 1976.

Facilities
Jonesboro Municipal Airport covers 1,000 acres (405 ha) at an elevation of 262 feet (80 m). It has two runways: 5/23 is 6,200 by 150 feet (1,890 x 46 m) and 13/31 is 4,099 by 150 feet (1,249 x 46 m).

In the year ending March 31, 2021 the airport had 20,156 aircraft operations, an average of 55 per day: 87% general aviation, 13% air taxi and less than 1% military. In April 2022, there were 122 aircraft based at this airport: 69 single-engine, 32 multi-engine, 18 jet and 3 helicopter.

Airlines and destinations 

Essential Air Service was formerly provided by Mesa Airlines. In 2012 EAS service was initiated by Air Choice One, the contract runs through February 28, 2026. With the closure of Air Choice One in July 2022, service was transferred to Air Choice One's Parent company Southern Airways Express. For a time in 2008 and 2009, the airport had no airline service.

Statistics

Top destinations

2020 tornado
On March 28, 2020, an EF3 tornado struck the airport, causing extensive damage. This included the destruction of a large metal building.

Notes

References 

 Essential Air Service documents (Docket OST-1997-2935) from the U.S. Department of Transportation:
 Order 2005-1-14: selecting Air Midwest, Inc., to provide essential air service at El Dorado/Camden, Jonesboro, Harrison and Hot Springs, Arkansas, at a subsidy rate of $4,155,550 annually for a two-year rate term.
 Order 2007-1-7: selecting Air Midwest, Inc. to provide essential air service at El Dorado/Camden, Jonesboro, Harrison and Hot Springs, Arkansas, at a subsidy rate of $4,296,348 annually for the two-year rate term beginning April 1, 2007.
 Order 2009-6-25: tentatively selecting Alaska Juneau Aeronautics, Inc. d/b/a SeaPort Airlines (SeaPort) to provide subsidized essential air service (EAS) at El Dorado/Camden, Harrison, Hot Springs, and Jonesboro, Arkansas, for two years.
 Order 2009-7-8: making final the tentative selection of Alaska Juneau Aeronautics, Inc. d/b/a SeaPort Airlines, to provide essential air service at El Dorado/Camden, Harrison, Hot Springs, and Jonesboro, Arkansas.

External links 
 Jonesboro Municipal Airport at City of Jonesboro website
 Jonesboro Municipal (JBR) from Arkansas Department of Aeronautics
 Aerial image as of 28 February 2001 from USGS The National Map
 

Airports in Arkansas
Essential Air Service
Transportation in Craighead County, Arkansas
Buildings and structures in Craighead County, Arkansas
Jonesboro, Arkansas